James Kaylor "Jim" Leedy (October 3, 1925 – September 5, 1983) was a member of the Ohio Senate, serving from the 19th District from 1967-. His district encompassed much of North-Central Ohio.

References

1924 births
Republican Party Ohio state senators
1983 deaths
20th-century American politicians
People from Shreve, Ohio